Raymond de Saussure (2 August 1894 – 29 October 1971) was a Swiss psychoanalyst, the first president of the European Psychoanalytical Federation.

Life
Raymond de Saussure was born in Geneva, the son of the linguist Ferdinand de Saussure. He underwent analysis with Sigmund Freud. He was a founding member of the Paris Psychoanalytic Society before spending time at the Berlin Psychoanalytic Institute undergoing analysis with Franz Alexander. During and after the Second World War he lived in New York City; in 1952, Saussure returned to Switzerland from the United States. He founded the Geneva Museum of the History of Science with Marc Cramer and others in 1955. He founded the European Psychoanalytic Federation with Wilhelm Solms-Rödelheim in 1966, and served as its president until his death.

He died in Geneva in 1971.

Works
 La méthode psychanalytique (with a preface by Sigmund Freud), 1922.
 Le miracle grec; étude psychanalytique sur la civilisation hellénique, 1939
 (with Paul Ricœur, Mircea Eliade and others) L'angoisse du temps présent et les devoirs de l'esprit, 1953
 (with Jean Vinchon) Mesmer et son secret, 1971
 (with Léon Chertok) La Naissance du psychanalyse, de Mesmer à Freud, 1973. Translated by R. H. Ahrenfeldt as The therapeutic revolution, from Mesmer to Freud, 1979.

References

1894 births
1971 deaths
Swiss psychoanalysts
Analysands of Sigmund Freud
Analysands of Rudolph Lowenstein
Analysands of Franz Alexander
Physicians from Geneva